Mġarr is a town in the north-west of Malta.

Mġarr could also refer to:

Mġarr (Gozo), a town and port in the east of Gozo
Mġarr ix-Xini, a small bay in Gozo
Mġarr phase, a short period in the prehistory of Malta